If They Only Knew may refer to:

 If They Only Knew (Trip Lee album), 2006
 If They Only Knew (Dave Liebman album), 1981
 "If They Only Knew" (song), a 2017 song by Alfie Arcuri